Silandrone (developmental code name SC-16148), also known as testosterone 17β-trimethylsilyl ether or 17β-trimethylsilyltestosterone, as well as 17β-(trimethylsiloxy)androst-4-en-3-one, is a synthetic anabolic-androgenic steroid (AAS) and an androgen ether – specifically, the 17β-trimethylsilyl ether of testosterone – which was developed by the G. D. Searle & Company in the 1960s but was never marketed. It has a very long duration of action when given via subcutaneous or intramuscular injection, as well as significantly greater potency than that of testosterone propionate. In addition, silandrone, unlike testosterone and most esters of testosterone like testosterone propionate, is orally active.

See also 
 List of androgen esters

References 

Abandoned drugs
Androgen ethers
Androgens and anabolic steroids
Androstanes
Prodrugs
Testosterone
Trimethylsilyl compounds